Three Bad Sisters is a 1956 American film noir crime film directed by Gilbert Kay, written by Gerald Drayson Adams, and starring Marla English, Kathleen Hughes, Sara Shane, John Bromfield and Jess Barker. It was released in January 1956, by United Artists.

Plot
Valerie, Vicki and Lorna Craig are the daughters of a man worth $40 million who is killed in a Wyoming plane crash. The pilot, Jim Norton, was unharmed.

Jim is unable to fly while the crash is investigated. Valerie offers him $200,000 to seduce and abandon her sister Lorna, executor of their father's will. Lorna is engaged to George Gurney, their father's attorney. Jim finds her contemplating a leap off a high cliff into the water, dared by Valerie to do it.

Valerie threatens to frame Jim for murdering her father if he refuses to cooperate. Then sister Vicki makes romantic advances, trying to lure Jim away from her sister's clutches. Valerie lashes her with a whip, scarring her face. Vicki flees in a car, crashes it and is killed.

Jim proposes marriage to Lorna, who isn't sure if she can trust him. Valerie attempts to murder Lorna and make it look like an accident. When her scheme fails, Valerie, too, is killed in a speeding car. Jim goes to the cliff and discovers Lorna has made the leap. He dives into the water and saves her.

Cast 
Marla English as Vicki Craig
Kathleen Hughes as Valerie Craig
Sara Shane as Lorna Craig
John Bromfield as Jim Norton
Jess Barker as George Gurney
Madge Kennedy as Martha Craig
Anthony George as Tony Cadiz 
Marlene Felton as Nadine

References

External links 
 

1956 films
United Artists films
Film noir
American crime drama films
1956 crime drama films
Films scored by Paul Dunlap
1950s English-language films
1950s American films
American black-and-white films